In abstract algebra, the idealizer of a subsemigroup T of a semigroup S is the largest subsemigroup of S in which T is an ideal. Such an idealizer is given by

In ring theory, if A is an additive subgroup of a ring R, then  (defined in the multiplicative semigroup of R) is the largest subring of R in which A is a two-sided ideal.

In Lie algebra, if L is a Lie ring (or Lie algebra) with Lie product [x,y], and S is an additive subgroup of L, then the set

is classically called the normalizer of S, however it is apparent that this set is actually the Lie ring equivalent of the idealizer. It is not necessary to specify that [S,r] ⊆ S, because anticommutativity of the Lie product causes [s,r] = −[r,s] ∈ S. The Lie "normalizer" of S is the largest subring of L in which S is a Lie ideal.

Comments

Often, when right or left ideals are the additive subgroups of R of interest, the idealizer is defined more simply by taking advantage of the fact that multiplication by ring elements is already absorbed on one side. Explicitly,

if T is a right ideal, or

if L is a left ideal.

In commutative algebra, the idealizer is related to a more general construction. Given a commutative ring R, and given two subsets A and B of a right R-module M, the conductor or transporter is given by 
.
In terms of this conductor notation, an additive subgroup B of R has idealizer 
.

When A and B are ideals of R, the conductor is part of the structure of the residuated lattice of ideals of R.

Examples
The multiplier algebra M(A) of a C*-algebra A is isomorphic to the idealizer of π(A) where π is any faithful nondegenerate representation of A on a Hilbert space H.

Notes

References

Abstract algebra
Group theory
Ring theory